The 1998/99 NTFL season was the 78th season of the Northern Territory Football League (NTFL).

Waratah have won there 14th premiership title while defeating St Marys in the grand final by 66 points.

Grand Final

References

Northern Territory Football League seasons
NTFL